The 1955 European Baseball Championship was held in Spain and was won by Spain. Belgium finished as runner-up.

Standings

References
(NL) European Championship Archive at honkbalsite

European Baseball Championship
European Baseball Championship
1955
1955 in Spanish sport